The Smilga is a river in the Kėdainiai district municipality, in Kaunas County, central Lithuania.

It begins near the village of Patranys, in Krakės Eldership. The Smilga river flows mostly in a southeasterly direction through the Josvainiai Forest. It joins the Nevėžis in the centre of Kėdainiai. 

The valley in upper and middle courses is negligible, though in becomes steep in the lower course. The course at some places is straightened. 

The Smilga passes through Medininkai, Palainiškiai, Šiukštuliškiai, Lipliūnai, Stasiūnai, Tubiai, Kėboniai, Bartkūniškiai, Pasmilgys villages and Kėdainiai city.

The name Smilga comes from the Lithuanian word smilga ('bentgrass').

Images

References

Rivers of Lithuania
Kėdainiai District Municipality